8:46 may refer to:

8 minutes 46 seconds, a symbol of police brutality associated with the murder of George Floyd
8:46 (special), a 2020 performance special by American comedian Dave Chappelle about violence against African-Americans
8:46 (video game), based on the September 11 attacks